The Sicilian vowel system is characteristic of the dialects of Sicily, Southern Calabria, Cilento and Salento.  It may alternatively be referred to as the Sicilian vocalic scheme or the Calabro-Sicilian vowel system.

The Sicilian vowel system differs greatly from the evolution of the Classical Latin vowel system into the Vulgar Latin vowel system found in the greater part of the Romance area. This resulted in a five-vowel system.

Historical phonology
The exact historical development of the Sicilian vowel system is unknown. Gerhard Rohlfs holds the view that this system is not the result of internal change, but of a later romanization (neoromanizzazione) of Sicily after the breakdown of Byzantine domination. Fanciullo (1984), however, claims that there was an uninterrupted continuation of Romance dialects during Byzantine domination. He explains the Sicilian vowel system through bilingualism, where Romance ,  was identified with Byzantine , ; variation between the two vowel systems seems to have persisted until the post-Norman era.

Calvano argued that Sicilian is an Italo-Western language, given the observation that Sicilian vocalism, but not Sardinian vocalism, is predictable from that of Italo-Western. Lausberg posited that Sicilian vocalism arose as a variation of the Italo-Western development by merging lax, high vowels with tense, mid vowels to lax, high vowels, followed by the merger which is peculiar to Sicilian. Bertoni, whose work was taken up again in Schiaffini (1957), argued that Sicilian had an intermediate Sardinian development on the basis of thirteenth-century texts. Hall grouped Sicilian along with Sardinian: "The earliest group [Southern Romance] to split off [from Proto-Romance] through not sharing in the merger of ĭ and ē, involved Sardinian, Lucanian and Sicilian... Proto-Italo-Western was then defined as the "intermediate stage that was the parent of the Romance languages not included in the Southern or Eastern groups."

An obvious quality of the Sicilian vowel system is the restriction of vowels other than the aforementioned five (a, e, i, o, u). However, Sicilian is a vigorous language and historically, has always Sicilianized foreign loanwords over time.

See also
Sicily
Sicilian School
Sicilian language
Gallo-Italic of Sicily
Siculo-Arabic
Sicilian orthography

References

External links
 www.linguasiciliana.org
 www.linguasiciliana.it
 Arba Sicula: a non-profit organisation dedicated to preserving the Sicilian language
 Ph.D. dissertation by Angelica Vittoria Costagliola 

Sicilian language